Alphonse Sormany (March 31, 1880 – March 5, 1943) was a Canadian politician. He served in the Legislative Assembly of New Brunswick as a member from Gloucester County.

References 

1880 births
1943 deaths
Université Laval alumni